was a village located in Seta District, Gunma Prefecture, Japan.

As of September 1, 2007, the village had an estimated population of 22,267 and a population density of 316.20 persons per km². The total area was 70.42 km².

History
On May 5, 2009, Fujimi was merged into the expanded city of Maebashi. Seta District also ceased to exist as a result.

Geography
Located in the northwestern portion of the Kantō Plain, the village stretched from the summit of Mount Akagi to the bottom. At the summit of Mount Akagi, there are two lakes, Ōnuma and Konuma, caldera lakes. Alpine plants such as Asian skunk cabbages grow in the marshland. The northern portion of the village was mainly covered by forests without many human dwellings, while the southern portion was flat with farmland.

Surrounding municipalities
 Maebashi
 Kiryū
 Numata
 Shibukawa
(all in Gunma Prefecture)

Education

Primary schools
 Hara Elementary School
 Ishii Elementary School
 Shirakawa Elementary School
 Tokizawa Elementary School

Junior high schools
 Fujimi Junior High School

References

External links

Dissolved municipalities of Gunma Prefecture
Populated places disestablished in 2009
Maebashi